The Jackpots was a Swedish progressive-styled pop group, located in Gothenburg.

Career highlights
The Jackpots made two albums, in 1967 and 1968. 
They became more popular in Belgium and Denmark.

The Jackpots also sang in four-voice harmonies, something as can heard in "Jack In The Box", where backwards recording techniques were used, which for that time, had an impressive sound.

Collaborations
Graham Gouldman and Eric Stewart, later of 10cc, contributed with songs for the Jackpots. Perry Ford who was a member of the English pop trio, Ivy League, also contributed with Lincoln City.

Discography

References

Swedish musical groups